Phaeostrymon alcestis, the soapberry hairstreak, is the only species of the gossamer-winged butterfly genus Phaeostrymon. It is found in southwestern United States and Mexico. 

Eumaeini
Monotypic butterfly genera
Lycaenidae genera
Taxa named by William J. Clench